CitizenLab is a Belgian civic tech company that builds citizen engagement platforms for local governments.  The company was founded in 2015 by Wietse Van Ransbeeck, Aline Muylaert, and Koen Gremmelprez. CitizenLab uses a cloud-based software as a service (SaaS) model to provide local governments with readymade platforms and tools for collecting and managing citizen input.

History 
CitizenLab was founded in September 2015 in Brussels, Belgium by entrepreneurs Wietse Van Ransbeeck, Aline Muylaert, and Koen Gremmelprez. At the time, all three were students at the Solvay Brussels School of Economics and Management.

CitizenLab states that it has provided citizen engagement platforms for over 400 local governments in 18 countries. These countries include Belgium, Netherlands, France, Germany, Denmark, United Kingdom, Norway, Canada, the United States, and Chile.

Platform 
The goal of the CitizenLab platform is to facilitate civic engagement through a two-way digital platform. The platform uses a cloud-based software as a service (SaaS).The front end of the CitizenLab platform has participation features such as participatory budgeting, survey and polling, idea collection and voting, and citizen initiatives. Features on the back end of the platform allows local governments to gather and manage citizen data and facilitate decision-making based on citizen feedback.

In the spring of 2019, CitizenLab raised two million euros in order to aid the company's expansion into international markets.  Investors include: Inventures and finance.brussels funds, the ING bank and the IT group Cipal-Schaubroeck. In May 2019, CitizenLab took part in a Nesta experiment where six cities were sponsored to use the CitizenLab platform in order to explore whether technology can increase government efficiency and transparency.

In March of 2021, CitizenLab announced on its blog that it would be shifting to an open source model. Co-founder Wietse Van Ransbeeck attributed the decision to a desire to increase transparency and "[make their] platform accessible to all civic organizations — from universities and NGOs, to political parties and sports teams."

Awards 
 VivaTech Paris, "Digital Inclusion" (2019)
 Wietse Van Ransbeeck & Aline Muylaert, listed as ‘50 Flemings of the Future' (2018)
 Aline Muylaert and Wietse Van Ransbeeck placed on Forbes 30 Under 30 list for Law and Policy (2018)
 Young Belgian Startup of the Year (2017)
 One of the 10 Radical Changemakers, Radio 1, De Standaard and De Sociale Innovatiefabriek (2017)
 One of the 5 Smart City Applications, Gartner (2017)
 Aline Muylaert (Head of Sales), One of the 10 final nominees for the StartHer Award (2018)
 Selected as one of the 5 Best Smart City startups worldwide, 4YFN at the Smart City Expo World Congress, Barcelona (2016)

References 

Companies of Belgium
Belgian companies established in 2015